Isenburg-Arnfels was the name of a state of the Holy Roman Empire, located in the Bad Hönningen area in modern Rhineland-Palatinate, Germany.

Isenburg-Arnfels was created upon the partition in 1286 of the lands of Count Henry II between his sons, the youngest Gerlach receiving his territories in and around Bad Hönningen. The castle of Arenfels, from which the name of the state is derived, was built by Count Henry II in 1258/9. In 1379 after the death of the last count, Isenburg-Arnfels was inherited by Count Gerlach of Isenburg-Wied.

Counts of Isenburg-Arnfels

Counties of the Holy Roman Empire
House of Isenburg